Hollywood Chewing Gum is a brand of French chewing gum belonging  to the group Mondelēz International since 2012.

History
The first published advertisement for the brand appears in 1958, and the first television advertisement in 1968. The slogan Fraîcheur de Vivre ("Freshness of life") was coined in 1972 by Jean Verrecchia, based on the concepts of youth, freedom, and freshness.

In 1986, a sugar-free variation called Hollywood Light was launched, followed by Hollywood Blancheur ("Hollywood Whitener") in 2001.

External links
 Official website

Chewing gum
Mondelez International brands
French brands